Vladimir Stoyanov (27 September 1964 – 18 June 2019) was a Bulgarian footballer who played as a forward. He earned one cap for the Bulgarian national team in 1989.

References

External links
 
 

1964 births
2019 deaths
Bulgarian footballers
Bulgaria international footballers
FC Chernomorets Burgas players
Deportivo de La Coruña players
FC Lokomotiv 1929 Sofia players
Botev Plovdiv players
FC Spartak Plovdiv players
First Professional Football League (Bulgaria) players
Second Professional Football League (Bulgaria) players
Segunda División players
Bulgarian expatriate footballers
Bulgarian expatriate sportspeople in Spain
Expatriate footballers in Spain
Sportspeople from Burgas
Association football forwards